Route 10 is a , two-lane, uncontrolled-access, secondary provincial highway in western Prince Edward Island, Canada. Its western terminus is at Route 1A in Bedeque and Area and its eastern terminus is at Route 1 in Tryon.

Route description 

The route begins at its western terminus and heads south, snaking its way to Borden-Carleton. It then turns southeast and goes to Cape Traverse. It then goes eastward until it reached its eastern terminus in Tryon.

References 

010
010